Metallus is a genus of sawflies belonging to the family Tenthredinidae. The species of this genus are found in Europe and North America.

Species 
The genus includes the following species:

 Metallus albipes (Cameron, 1875)
 Metallus capitalis
 Metallus lanceolatus (Thomson, 1870)
 Metallus pumilis (Klug, 1816)
 Metallus rohweri

References

Tenthredinidae
Sawfly genera